Eusebio Poncela Aprea (born 15 September 1947) is a Spanish actor.

Biography  
Eusebio Poncela Aprea was born in Madrid on 15 September 1947.

After graduating in drama, he made his debut onstage in the play Mariana Pineda in the mid 1960s.

He appeared in The Cannibal Man (1972) and A House Without Boundaries (1972), but his first major role was the protagonist of the cult film Arrebato (1979), directed by Iván Zulueta. In that year, he also featured in Guillo Pontecorvo's Ogro.

Another hit was the TVE miniseries Los gozos y las sombras (1985). With Antonio Banderas, Poncela co-starred in Law of Desire (1987), directed by Pedro Almodóvar.

He came back to cinema with  Martín (Hache), by Adolfo Aristarain. Another films:  Tuno negro (2001) and Remake (2006); or Intacto, by Juan Carlos Fresnadillo, with Max von Sydow.

At Gijón International Film Festival in 2004, he received the Nacho Martinez Award.

Filmography

References

External links

1947 births
Living people
Spanish male stage actors
Spanish male film actors
Spanish male television actors
Male actors from Madrid
20th-century Spanish male actors
21st-century Spanish male actors